Gertrud Bing (7 June 1892 – 3 July 1964) was a German art historian and director of the Warburg Institute.

Biography 
Born in Hamburg, she was educated at the Lyceum in Hamburg from 1909 to 1913, and received her abitur from the Heinrich-Hertz Realgymnasium in 1916. After this, she studied at the universities of Munich and Hamburg. Her doctoral dissertation, written under the supervision of Ernst Cassirer, concerned Lessing and Leibniz.

In 1921/22 she began working as a librarian at the Kulturwissenschaftlichen Bibliothek Warburg, founded by Aby Warburg. In December 1933, the library was moved to London when the Nazis rose to power, becoming the Warburg Institute. With her partner, Fritz Saxl, the new institute's first director, she settled in Dulwich. Saxl died in 1948, and was succeeded as director by Henri Frankfort. 

After the death of Frankfort in 1954, Bing in 1955 became director of the institute and Professor of the History of the Classical Tradition. She held these posts until her retirement in 1959. Gertrud Bing died in 1964 in London, following a brief illness.

Writings
 Fragments sur Aby Warburg. Documents originaux et leur traduction française. Avant-propos de Carlo Ginzburg. Edited by Philippe Despoix and Martin Treml. Paris 2019.

References

External links
  
 Gertrud Bing  at the Dictionary of Art Historians

1892 births
1964 deaths
Directors of the Warburg Institute
German art historians
German emigrants to the United Kingdom
German women historians
Writers from Hamburg
Women art historians